Cosmic Tones for Mental Therapy is an album by the American Jazz musician Sun Ra and his Myth Science Arkestra. Recorded in 1963, but not released until 1967 on Sun Ra's own Saturn label, the record has become one of the most discussed of Ra's New York recordings. The record was reissued on compact disc by Evidence in 2000.

Originally released in a sleeve with a Sun Ra doodle, the better known cover, designed by Richard Pedreguera, was in place by 1969. Pedreguera also designed the sleeve for The Nubians of Plutonia at around the same time.

Reception and legacy 
The album has increasingly been discussed within the context of anticipating psychedelia or pointing towards the funk of George Clinton;
'Clinton's astral ritual seems as inspired by the Nation of Islam as it is by Sun Ra, and when asked about the Ra in 1979, Clinton said, "This boy was definitely out to lunch - the same place I eat at."
When reissued on CD, Art Forms of Dimensions Tomorrow was added to the disc.

The singer Bilal names it among his 25 favorite albums, citing Sun Ra's use of space, various noises, and African drums.

Track listing

12" Vinyl 
All songs by Sun Ra
Side A:
 "And Otherness" - (5.10)
 "Thither and Yon" - (4.01)
 "Adventure-Equation" - (8.26)
Side B:
 "Moon Dance" - (6.34)
 "Voice of Space" - (7.42)

Musicians 
 Sun Ra - Hammond B-3 Organ, Clavioline, Percussion
 Marshall Allen - Oboe, Percussion
 Danny Davis - Alto Sax, Flute
 John Gilmore - Bass Clarinet, Percussion
 possibly Bernard Pettaway - Bass Trombone
 Pat Patrick - Baritone Saxophone
 Robert Cummings - Bass Clarinet
 Ronnie Boykins - Bass
 Clifford Jarvis - Drums
 James Jacson - Percussion
 Tommy Hunter - Percussion, Reverb
 Ensemble vocals

First two tracks recorded at the Choreographer's Workshop, New York (the Arkestra's rehearsal space) in 1963. Adventure-Equation, Moon Dance and Voice of Space were recorded at the Tip Top club, Brooklyn, in the same year, at 10 in the morning whilst Tommy Hunter was playing nights there with Sarah McLawler's trio, since the club provided access to a Hammond B-3 organ gratis. Hunter remembers some neighbourhood kids running in during the recording and shouting, "These guys don't know how to play!".

Notes 

Sun Ra albums
1963 albums
El Saturn Records albums
Evidence Music albums